The Gustave Zédé class was a pair of submarines built for the French Navy just before World War I.

See also 
List of submarines of France

Bibliography

 

 
Submarine classes
Ship classes of the French Navy